Corporal William A. Clark (July 24, 1828 – January 9, 1916) was an American soldier of the Civil War who, during a battle at Nolensville, Tennessee on 15 February 1863, successfully defended a wagon train. For his actions he earned the Medal of Honor. He served with the 2nd Minnesota Volunteer Infantry Regiment. He was born in Pennsylvania, lived in Shelbyville and is buried in Nicollet, Minnesota.

Notes

External links
 

1828 births
1916 deaths
People of Pennsylvania in the American Civil War
Union Army soldiers
American Civil War recipients of the Medal of Honor
United States Army Medal of Honor recipients